The Triple Crown College Baseball League (TCCBL) is a wood bat collegiate summer baseball league based in Fort Collins, Colorado.  The TCCBL was founded in 2007 by Triple Crown Sports, a sports event marketing company also based out of Fort Collins, Colorado.  Dave King, owner of Triple Crown Sports, was instrumental in founding the league. The league consists of players from all levels of collegiate baseball, from NCAA Division I to NAIA and Junior-college players.  The 2009 edition of the league will consist of five teams, the Triple Crown Renegades, Colorado Khaos, Triple Crown Bandits, Triple Crown Bulldogs, and Colorado Aliens.

Season Structure
Teams in the league play a twenty-game league schedule, two tournaments, and additional games in non-league competitions. Member teams play seven-inning games with a ten-run "mercy" rule to expedite play.

Past Champions

League Awards

External links
 Triple Crown College Baseball League website

References

College baseball leagues in the United States
Baseball leagues in Colorado
Organizations based in Fort Collins, Colorado
Sports in Fort Collins, Colorado